Here Comes the Grump is an animated cartoon series produced by DePatie–Freleng Enterprises and aired on NBC from 1969 to 1970. It was later shown in reruns on Sci-Fi Channel's Cartoon Quest.

Structured as a battle between good and evil, the show was played for comedy. The Grump, the purportedly-threatening villain of the piece, was voiced by extravagant prop comic Rip Taylor.

History
The main character was a small, grumpy wizard who put a spell of gloom on the kingdom of the Princess Dawn. The Princess and her friend Terry Dexter (a boy from the "real" world) searched for the Cave of the Whispering Orchids to find a crystal key to break the spell, while the Grump tried to stop them. In each episode the Grump flew a dragon named Dingo, chasing Terry and Princess Dawn. This led them to bizarre places with strange characters, such as the Blabbermouth of Echo Island, where the mountains were made of living Swiss cheese.

The Princess had a pet named Bip — a vaguely doglike creature with tentacular legs, that sniffed clues like a hound dog, turned around by pulling in its tail and head and popping them back out at opposite ends, and communicated in the sounds of a soprano bugle. In most episodes, the Princess and her friends traveled in a flying car supported by a big balloon.

A recurring gag was that at the last minute when the Grump was about to catch up with Princess Dawn, the Dragon would sneeze and burn the little wizard.

The character of the Grump was based upon Yosemite Sam, also created by Friz Freleng. The Grump's Dragon was similar to Sam's in "Knighty Knight Bugs", right down to the fiery nasal explosions upon its master.

Broadcast
The series was broadcast by NBC from September 6, 1969 to April 25, 1970. NBC continued to air reruns until December 28, 1970.

The series lasted one season and was rerun, the most recent airing was on the Sci-Fi Channel in the mid 1990s. The complete series was released on DVD on January 31, 2006.

The series was called Ahi viene Cascarrabias in Spanish and was retransmitted into the 1970s and well into the 1980s by Televisa, in Mexico, with another rerun in 2006 after the DVD set was launched. It was "Grump, o feiticeiro trapalhão" in Brazilian Portuguese and was rerun in Brazil until 1993 by Rede Globo.

The only known merchandise for the show was a "Here Comes the Grump" Halloween mask, produced by the Ben Cooper Costume Company, for the 1969 holiday season.

Episode guide
There were 17 episodes, each containing two ten-minute shorts, giving a total of 34 separate cartoons.

 The Bloonywoonie Battle (First aired: 9/6/1969)
 The Great Grump Crunch (First aired: 9/13/1969)
 The Great Thorn Forest (First aired: 9/20/1969)
 The Eenie Meenie Miners (First aired: 9/27/1969)
 The Good Ghost Ship (First aired: 10/4/1969)
 Grump Meets Peter Paintbrush (First aired: 10/11/1969)
 The Lemonade Sea (First aired: 10/18/1969)
 Beware of Giants (First aired: 10/25/1969)
 Joltin' Jack-In Boxia (First aired: 11/1/1969)
 Visit to a Ghost Town (First aired: 11/8/1969)
 A Mess for King Midix (First aired: 11/15/1969)
 The Shoes of Shoe-Cago (First aired: 11/22/1969)
 Witch Is Witch? (First aired: 11/29/1969)
 The Yuks of Gagville (First aired: 12/6/1969)
 Toilin' Toolie Birds (First aired: 12/13/1969)
 The Grand Slam of Door City (First aired: 12/20/1969)
 Under the Pea Green Sea (First aired: 12/27/1969)
 Sugar and Spite (First aired: 1/3/1970)
 The Great Shampoo of Snow White City (First aired: 1/10/1970)
 The Grump Meets the Grouch Grooch (First aired: 1/17/1970)
 The Wily Wheelies (First aired: 1/24/1970)
 The Blabbermouth of Echo Island (First aired: 1/31/1970)
 With Malice in Blunderland (First aired: 2/7/1970)
 Apachoo Choo-Choo (First aired: 2/14/1970)
 A Hitch in Time (First aired: 2/21/1970)
 The Shaky Shutter-Bugs (First aired: 2/28/1970)
 S'No Land Like Snow Land (First aired: 3/7/1970)
 Good Grief, Mother Goose (First aired: 3/14/1970)
 The Balled-Up Bloonywoonies (First aired: 3/21/1970)
 Cherub Land (First aired: 3/28/1970)
 Meet the Blockheads (First aired: 4/4/1970)
 Hoppy-Go-Lucky Hippetty Hoppies (First aired: 4/11/1970)
 The Blunderful Flying Machine (First aired: 4/18/1970)
 The Absent-Minded Wizard (First aired: 4/25/1970)

Voices
 Rip Taylor - The Grump
 Jay North - Terry Dexter
 Avery Schreiber
 Stefanianna Christopherson - Princess Dawn
 Marvin Miller
 Athena Lorde
 Larry D. Mann
 June Foray

Staff
Direction: Gerry Chiniquy, Art Davis, George Gordon, Sid Marcus, Hawley Pratt, Grant Simmons
Story Supervision: John W. Dunn
Stories: Don Christensen, Nick George, Bill Lutz
Layout: Pete Alvarado, Bob Givens, Herb Johnson, Jack Miller, Dick Ung, Don Sheppard, Martin Studler, Al Wilson
Character Design: Art Leonardi
Animation: Warren Batchelder, Robert Bentley, William Carney, Edward DeMattia, Xenia, John Gibbs, Manny Gould, Ed Love, Ed Rehberg, Manny Perez, Bob Richardson, Ed Solomon, Robert Taylor, Lloyd Vaughan, Don Williams
Backgrounds: Richard Thomas, Mary O'Loughlin, Tom O'Loughlin
Film Editing Supervised by Lee Gunther
Film Editing: Allan Potter, Todd McKay, Lloyd Friedgen
Music: Doug Goodwin
Production Supervision: Jim Foss
Prod. Coordinator: Harry Love
Sound by Producers' Sound Service, Inc.
Produced by David H. DePatie, Friz Freleng

Film

A feature film adaptation based on the series was in production. It was produced by Ánima Estudios in Mexico and the newly launched GFM Animation, with the animation being done at Prime Focus World in London.

The film was released in Mexico on July 26, 2018, followed by the US release on September 14, under the name A Wizard's Tale.

References

External links
 DePatie-Freleng fansite
 
 

1960s American animated television series
1969 American television series debuts
1970s American animated television series
1970 American television series endings
American children's animated comedy television series
American children's animated fantasy television series
English-language television shows
NBC original programming
Television series by DePatie–Freleng Enterprises
Television series by United Artists Television